Amerang is a municipality in the district of Rosenheim in Bavaria in Germany.

It is known for its historical car museum, historical farmhouse museum and concerts in the Amerang Castle.

See also
Grub (Amerang)
Kirchensur

References

Rosenheim (district)